Narthaki is a 2011 Tamil-language drama film written and directed by Vijayapadma and produced by Punnagai Poo Gheetha. Focusing on the issue of transgender people, the film stars Kalki Subramaniam, Vivin and Girish Karnad. Music for the film was composed by G. V. Prakash Kumar and the film opened to mixed reviews in May 2011.

Cast

Kalki Subramaniam as Kalki
Leema Babu as Meena
Girish Karnad
Suzane George as Transgender's mother
Punnagai Poo Gheetha
Vivin
V. K. R. Raghunath
Azhagu
Karate Venkatesh
Ashwin as Subbu
Abhishek
Abbas
Susan
Swathisha as transgender
Reshma

Production
'Punnagai Poo' Gheetha readily agreed to finance the venture after Vijayapadma approached her with the script, as she was keen to make off-beat ventures. The movie was shot for a period of two months in places such as Thanjavur, Thiruvaiyaru, Mumbai and Chennai. The film's lead performer, Kalki Subramaniam, revealed that the script was derived from the real life incidents of transgender people. The team were initially upset that the film was awarded an "A" certificate, but were unable to change the decision of the censor board.

Release
The film opened to mixed reviews in May 2011. Rediff.com noted "if anything, it's the screenplay that falters at many places" and "the pace lags and picks up randomly", with "the dialogues, while trying to sound honest, appear quite clichéd at times and trite". The reviewer however adds that Narthaki "attempts to break new ground and address the pain of a community that has suffered for ages" and that "it showcases the fact that humanity needs to rise above such prejudices and accord transgenders the respect they deserve and for that, it needs to be watched". Similarly Behindwoods.com gave it a single star out of five, but added it is "an attempt that needs to be encouraged" and that "it is worth noticing since it provided answers for many questions among the general public that have very little information about the sexual minorities." Narthagi shared the Best Social Awareness Award at the 2012 Norway Tamil Film Festival Awards.

Soundtrack

The film's soundtrack was composed by G. V. Prakash Kumar, with lyrics written by Na. Muthukumar. Reviewing the album, Behindwoods.com noted the composer "has boldly taken up an experimental project".

 "The Destiny" - Naresh Iyer and Saindhavi
 "Poovin Manam Poovil Illai" — Tippu and Harini
 "Vaan Mazhaiyin Thuligal" — P. Unnikrishnan and Sudha Raghunathan
 "Jai Jai Madha Sonthasi Madha" — Vijay Yesudas
 "Chinnanchiru Idhayathil" — Vijay Prakash and Prashanthini

References

External links
 

2011 films
2010s Tamil-language films
Films scored by G. V. Prakash Kumar
Cross-dressing in Indian films
Transgender-related films
Indian LGBT-related films
2000s Tamil-language films
2011 LGBT-related films
2011 directorial debut films